Ferdinand Omanyala Omurwa (born 2 January 1996) is a Kenyan sprinter competing in the 60 metres, 100 m and 200 m. In 2022, he won his first international championships, with victories in the 100 m at the Commonwealth Games, and African Championships in Athletics. Omanyala is the African record holder and the ninth-fastest man of all time in the event after clocking a time of 9.77 seconds on 18 September 2021 in Nairobi. He also holds Kenyan national record in the 60 m.

Early life
Ferdinand Omanyala Omurwa was born in Hamisi as the third son of Dishon and Adelaide Omurwa, though the family settled in Tongaren soon afterwards.

Career
In 2015, Omanyala began his athletics career in Kenya as a chemistry student the University of Nairobi. He made this move after a friend noticed his speed while he was playing rugby. He made the switch from rugby to track and only a few weeks later he ran a time of 10.4 s in his first AK meet in Kakamega. The same year, he won the national Olympics trials over the 100 m distance in a time of 10.37 s but never met the qualifying standard for the Olympics which was 10.16 s at the time.

Following a doping offence in 2017 Omanyala received a 14-month suspension. He tested positive for the prohibited substance betamethasone, after undergoing treatment for his back injury which he got during training.

Omanyala won the national title in the 100 metres in 2019.

On 30 March 2021, he set a national record of 10.01 seconds in the 100 m in winning a meeting at Yabatech Sport Complex in Lagos, Nigeria. At the 2020 Tokyo Olympics 100 metres semi-final in August that year, he set a new national record of 10.00 seconds. Omanyala was 0.04 s behind eventual silver medalist Fred Kerley and 0.02 s behind eventual bronze medalist Andre De Grasse. The same month, he ran a new personal best of 9.86 seconds in Austria, becoming the first Kenyan to ever break the 10-second barrier. In September, he ran a 9.77 seconds (+1.2 m/s) for a new African record at the Absa Kip Keino Classic held in Nairobi, Kenya coming in a close second place behind Trayvon Bromell, who ran a world leading 9.76 s.

In June 2022, Omanyala became African 100 m champion before he was eliminated in the semi-finals of the World Championships held in Eugene, Oregon in July, after arriving at the event only a couple of hours before his first round heat due to visa problems. In August, he claimed Kenya's first gold medal at the Birmingham Commonwealth Games, becoming the first Kenyan to win gold in the 100-metre race in 60 years.

Personal life
Omanyala is married to Laventa Amutavi and they have a son. His official sponsors are Odibets, a Kenyan sports betting company.

Achievements

International competitions

1Time from the heats; Omanyala was replaced in the final.

National titles
 Kenyan Athletics Championships
 100 metres: 2019, 2022
 200 metres: 2022

References

External links

Ferdinand Omurwa at the-sports.org

1996 births
Living people
Kenyan male sprinters
Kenyan sportspeople in doping cases
Sportspeople from Nairobi
Doping cases in athletics
Athletes (track and field) at the 2020 Summer Olympics
Olympic athletes of Kenya
People from Vihiga County
People from Bungoma County
African Championships in Athletics winners
Athletes (track and field) at the 2022 Commonwealth Games
Commonwealth Games gold medallists for Kenya
Commonwealth Games medallists in athletics
Medallists at the 2022 Commonwealth Games